Pontypridd is a constituency of the Senedd. It elects one Member of the Senedd by the first past the post method of election. It is also one of eight constituencies in the South Wales Central electoral region that elects four additional members (along with eight constituency members), to produce a degree of proportional representation for the region as a whole.

Boundaries

The constituency was created for the first election to the Assembly, in 1999, with the name and boundaries of the Pontypridd Westminster constituency. It is within the preserved county of Mid Glamorgan.

The other seven constituencies of the region are Cardiff Central, Cardiff North, Cardiff South and Penarth, Cardiff West, Cynon Valley, Rhondda and Vale of Glamorgan.

Voting
In general elections for the Senedd, each voter has two votes. The first vote may be used to vote for a candidate to become the Member of the Senedd for the voter's constituency, elected by the first past the post system. The second vote may be used to vote for a regional closed party list of candidates. Additional member seats are allocated from the lists by the d'Hondt method, with constituency results being taken into account in the allocation.

Assembly Members and Members of the Senedd

Elections

Elections in the 2020s

Elections in the 2010s

Regional ballots rejected at the count: 147

Elections in the 2000s

2003 Electorate: 63,204
Regional ballots rejected: Not reported

Elections in the 1990s

References

Senedd constituencies in the South Wales Central electoral region
Politics of Rhondda Cynon Taf
Pontypridd
1999 establishments in Wales
Constituencies established in 1999